Airbag is a 1997 Spanish film written and directed by Juanma Bajo Ulloa. It stars Fernando Guillén Cuervo, who co-wrote the film's screenplay with Bajo, Maria de Medeiros and Javier Bardem. Also stars unknown actors as Karra Elejalde and Manuel Manquiña, and Spanish celebrities as Francisco Rabal, Rosa Maria Sardà, Rossy de Palma, Santiago Segura, Alaska and Karlos Arguiñano.

Cast

Awards and nominations

Film Awards

Submissions
Goya Awards
Best New Actor for Manuel Manquiña (nominated)
 British Independent Film Awards
 Best Foreign Independent FIlm (nominated)

References

External links
 
 

1997 films
German road movies
Portuguese comedy films
1990s Spanish-language films
1997 action comedy films
1990s road movies
Spanish road movies
1990s crime comedy films
German crime comedy films
Spanish crime comedy films
1990s German films
1990s Spanish films